Middleton Island  is a small, uninhabited island in the U.S. state of Alaska, located in the Pacific Ocean approximately  southwest of Cordova. The island was briefly home to Middleton Island Air Force Station, an early warning radar station, from 1958 until the station's closure in 1963. The island now hosts the unattended Middleton Island Airport and a NEXRAD weather radar.


Climate
Middleton Island has a subpolar oceanic climate (Köppen: Cfc)

See also
 List of islands of Alaska
Official Middleton Island Website

References

External links
 Important Bird Areas : Middleton Island, Alaska

Islands of Alaska
Islands of Chugach Census Area, Alaska
Islands of Unorganized Borough, Alaska
Uninhabited islands of Alaska